Benjamin Mwangi is a Kenyan politician from the United Democratic Alliance and MP for Embakasi Central.

References

See also 

 13th Parliament of Kenya

Living people
Year of birth missing (living people)
Place of birth missing (living people)
Members of the 13th Parliament of Kenya
People from Nairobi
United Democratic Alliance (Kenya) politicians